The Chameleon is a 1920 silent comedy film directed by Carl Hagen and starring Max Landa, Reinhold Schünzel, and Hanni Weisse. It was shot in Vienna.

Cast
Max Landa
Reinhold Schünzel
Hanni Weisse

References

External links

Films of the Weimar Republic
Films directed by Carl Hagen
German silent feature films
1920 comedy films
German comedy films
German black-and-white films
Silent comedy films
1920s German films
1920s German-language films